Law, Culture and the Humanities is a peer-reviewed academic journal that publishes papers three times a year in the field of humanities. The journal's editor-in-chief is Austin Sarat (Amherst College). It was established in 2005 and is currently published by SAGE Publications on behalf of the Association for the Study of Law, Culture and the Humanities. The journal covers legal history, legal theory and jurisprudence, law and cultural studies, law and literature, and legal hermeneutics.

Abstracting and indexing 
Law, Culture and the Humanities is abstracted and indexed in International Bibliography of the Social Sciences and Scopus.

External links

References

SAGE Publishing academic journals
English-language journals
Multidisciplinary humanities journals
Triannual journals
Publications established in 2005